Glenniea unijuga is a species of plant in the family Sapindaceae. It is endemic to Sri Lanka.

Culture
Known as "වල් මොර - wal mora" in Sinhala.

References

Flora of Sri Lanka
unijuga
Vulnerable plants
Taxonomy articles created by Polbot